Laval Centre (formerly known as Laval-des-Rapides) was a federal electoral district in Quebec, Canada, that was represented in the House of Commons of Canada from 1979 to 2004.

It was created as "Laval-des-Rapides" riding in 1976 from parts of Laval, Ahuntsic, Dollard and Duvernay ridings.

It was renamed "Laval Centre" in 1990.

It was abolished in 2003 when it was redistributed between Laval and Marc-Aurèle-Fortin ridings.

Members of Parliament

This riding elected the following Members of Parliament:

Election results

Laval-des-Rapides

Laval Centre

See also
 List of Canadian federal electoral districts
 Past Canadian electoral districts

External links
Riding history from the Library of Parliament:
Laval-des-Rapides
Laval Centre

Former federal electoral districts of Quebec
Politics of Laval, Quebec